MY 007 was a James Bond-themed superyacht that sank off the coast of Greece on 2 September 2022.

Description 
007 was a monohull yacht with an aluminum superstructure and three teak wood decks. The ship's two diesel engines provided 1,300 horsepower, allowing for a cruising speed of 10 knots and a maximum speed of 12 knots.

History 
007 was completed by Aegean Yacht at Bodrum, Turkey as Amazon-A in December 2006. It was later renamed Royal Enterprise and was sold to its final owner in 2012. It last underwent refurbishment in 2018 in Turkey.

On the night of 2 September 2022, 007 experienced a GPS malfunction while off Kythnos Island, Greece. Reportedly, the captain of the ship moved closer to the shore as a result of this malfunction, steering the ship into water less than ten meters deep. 007 ran aground on rocks, developing a list and becoming half submerged. By the time the Coast Guard arrived, the vessel was beyond rescue, but the five people on board were saved without injury. The following day, an antipollution barrier was established around the ship and an investigation was launched into the incident.

References 

Yachts
2006 ships
Maritime incidents in 2022
James Bond